Girardelli is an Italian surname. Notable people with the surname include:

Marc Girardelli (born 1963), Austrian and Luxembourgish alpine skier
Valter Girardelli (born 1955), Italian admiral

See also
Ghirardelli Chocolate Company
Ghirardelli (surname)

Italian-language surnames